Danilo Golubović (born 21 October 1963) was the Deputy Minister in the Serbian Ministry of Agriculture, Forestry and Water Management.

References 

1963 births
Living people
Government ministers of Serbia